Pyrola rotundifolia, the round-leaved wintergreen, is a plant species of the genus Pyrola. It is found in Europe, Japan, Mongolia, Myanmar and Russia.

References

rotundifolia
Flora of the Northeastern United States
Medicinal plants
Flora of North America
Plants described in 1753
Taxa named by Carl Linnaeus
Flora without expected TNC conservation status